Randolph E. "Randy" Buehler Jr. is an American game developer. He was the Vice President of Digital Gaming at Wizards of the Coast, Inc., now a subsidiary of Hasbro, Inc., as well as the commentator for the Magic Pro Tour. He was formerly a weekly writer for Magicthegathering.com's "Latest Developments" column and former Magic Pro Tour player.

Before Wizards of the Coast
Buehler started playing Magic: The Gathering just before the Homelands set came out. After initially playing Magic with roommates at Carnegie Mellon University, Buehler gained a fierce interest in tournament level Magic. Many Pro Tour Qualifier and Grand Prix tournaments provided valuable experience that would lead to Buehler's first Pro Tour win (Pro Tour-Chicago 1997), which was also his first Pro Tour appearance.

While working on his Ph.D. in History and Philosophy of Quantum Mechanics, Buehler's interest in school began to fade as his financial successes in Magic: the Gathering yielded a satisfactory lifestyle, so he took a two-year leave of absence from school to pursue his passion.

A favorite style of play for him has always been card drawing. His famous decks include CMU Blue and Draw Go. When he won Pro Tour-Chicago '97 he used a Necropotence deck.

He gained the attention of Wizards of the Coast with his skill on the Magic Pro Tour and was eventually offered a position at Magic Research and Development as a developer. Before he could return to college from his two-year leave, Buehler decided to take the job. As a developer, his responsibilities would include testing out cards before they were printed to adjust and tweak them for power level reasons and fairness.

At Wizards of the Coast
When Buehler arrived at Magic R&D, development for the Invasion set was just beginning. Since then, he was a developer in many sets. His first assignment as a lead developer was in the Odyssey set, and in the summer of 2001 Randy Buehler was promoted to the position of lead developer of all Magic.

On January 4, 2002, Randy Buehler published the first Magicthegathering.com "Latest Developments" column, wherein a developer writes about a topic related to Magic development. On January 30, 2004 Buehler announced that he would leave "Latest Developments" and be succeeded by Aaron Forsythe. For several years, Buehler served as a commentator for the Magic Pro Tour webcasts, joined by co-hosts such as Mike Flores. He also served as the host of the monthly Magic: the Gathering podcasts, which covered new sets and upcoming tournaments, and as the floor reporter for the Pro Tour podcasts, which feature ongoing coverage of each Pro Tour event.

Randy Buehler was in charge of the Dungeons & Dragons Insider and Gleemax community sites after the release of 4th edition of Dungeons & Dragons. He was laid off, like Dave Noonan and Jonathan Tweet, among others, on December 2, 2008, for Wizards of the Coast to better focus both the digital team on Magic Online and D&D Insider.

At Mind Control Software
As of 2009, Randy Buehler was Vice President of Business Strategy at Mind Control Software.  There, he was working with Richard Garfield and Skaff Elias on Mind Twist, a free-to-play strategy game, although as of 2021 there have been no updates, and Mind Control Software has not published a game since 2007 nor is its website active.

Personal life
Buehler is married to fellow Wizards employee and Magic player Del Laugel, who is the Magic Lead Editor. The couple have a daughter, Kira Elizabeth Buehler.

Accomplishments

Buehler was Pro Tour Rookie of the Year in the 1997–98 season.  He was inducted into the Magic: The Gathering Hall of Fame in 2007 at the World Championship in New York City.

References

 "Defining Black": 
 Coldsnap announcement: 

1971 births
American Magic: The Gathering players
Carnegie Mellon University alumni
Living people
People from Polk County, Tennessee
People from Renton, Washington
Place of birth missing (living people)